This is a list of members of the 18th Legislative Assembly of Queensland from 1909 to 1912, as elected at the 1909 state election held on 2 October 1909.

  On 7 February 1911, William Kidston, the Premier of Queensland and Liberal member for Rockhampton, resigned to become President of the Land Court. Labor candidate John Adamson won the resulting by-election on 25 February 1911.
  On 7 February 1911, Arthur Hawthorn, the Liberal member for Enoggera, resigned following his appointment to the Queensland Legislative Council. Liberal candidate Richard Trout won the resulting by-election on 25 February 1911.
  On 10 March 1911, Joshua Thomas Bell, the Liberal member for Dalby, died. At the resulting by-election on 2 April 1911, Liberal candidate William Vowles was elected.
  In July 1911, the member for Fitzroy, James Crawford was expelled from the Labor Party for alleged disloyalty. He served out his term as an independent.
  On 24 August 1911, Denis Keogh, the Liberal member for Rosewood, died. Liberal candidate Harry Stevens won the resulting by-election on 16 September 1911.
  On 30 August 1911, Richard John Cottell, the Liberal member for Toowong, died. The Secretary for Public Lands and member for Brisbane North, Edward Macartney, resigned on 5 September. By-elections for both seats were held on 16 September 1911, with Macartney switching to Toowong, and Liberal candidate Thomas Welsby winning Brisbane North.

See also
1909 Queensland state election
Second Kidston Ministry (1908–1911)
Denham Ministry (1911–1915)

References

 Waterson, Duncan Bruce: Biographical Register of the Queensland Parliament 1860-1929 (second edition), Sydney 2001.
 
 

Members of Queensland parliaments by term
20th-century Australian politicians